The second season of  Alarm für Cobra 11 – Die Autobahnpolizei aired between 11 March and 15 April 1997.

Format
Mark Keller as André Fux replaced Johannes Brandrup and Almut Eggert was demoted to recurring cast member. She departed the series after the season finale.

Cast

Main 
 Mark Keller - André Fux
 Erdoğan Atalay - Semir Gerkhan

Recurring 
 Almut Eggert - Katharina Lamprecht (Entire season)

Episodes

1997 German television seasons